This is a list of football clubs in Colombia, sorted by division, then alphabetically, and including geographical provenience and home stadium.

Categoría Primera A

Categoría Primera B

Former clubs 

Colombia
 
Football clubs
Football clubs